Laviv may refer to:

People
 Yigal Laviv, Israeli journalist who broke the Yadlin affair Israeli political corruption scandal
 Shmuel Laviv-Lubin (born 1923), Israeli Olympic sport shooter
 Laviv-Hussein Abu-Rochan (1911-1989), Druze Israeli politician

Other uses
 Laviv, a brand name for the drug Azficel-T

See also

 LAV IV (LAV 4), a variant of the General Motors LAV (Light Armoured Vehicle)